Harold Schofield (25 May 1903 – 1975) was an English footballer who played in the Football League for Bradford (Park Avenue), Chesterfield and Doncaster Rovers.

References

1903 births
1975 deaths
English footballers
Association football defenders
English Football League players
Bradford (Park Avenue) A.F.C. players
Chesterfield F.C. players
Doncaster Rovers F.C. players
Tunbridge Wells F.C. players